Tanysphyrus lemnae is a species of weevil native to Europe as well as North America; the larvae are leaf-miners in duckweed, genus Lemna.

References

Curculionidae
Beetles described in 1792
Beetles of Europe